Ibero-German is a collective term used to describe Spanish and Portuguese people or their descendants living in Germany. The expression is in reference to the Iberian Peninsula, including Spain, Portugal, Andorra, and Gibraltar. Luso-German is a term used to describe Portuguese people and their descendents in Germany.

According to Observatório da Emigração there are in 2020 some 229,391  Portuguese citizens living in Germany and registered with the Portuguese Embassy.

Brazilians and Hispanics in Germany, on the other hand, are referred to as Latino-Germans to geographically distinguish them from their European counterparts.

See also
Italo-German
Spaniards in Germany
Portuguese people in Germany

References

Ethnic groups in Germany